John Harold Douglas (29 April 1912 – 1982) was an Irish politician and an independent member of Seanad Éireann.  He was nominated by the Taoiseach to the 8th Seanad on 1 October 1954, replacing his deceased father James G. Douglas.

Douglas was a Quaker like his father, and succeeded him as managing director of the family linen and clothing companies. On 2 September 1941, he married Hazel née Malcolm (1915/6–8 September 2009); they had three children.

References 

1912 births
1982 deaths
Irish businesspeople
Irish Quakers
Members of the 8th Seanad
Nominated members of Seanad Éireann
Independent members of Seanad Éireann
20th-century Irish businesspeople
20th-century Quakers